Pasarni is a village in the taluka of Wai in the Satara district of Maharashtra.

Main Attraction
 En route is the picturesque Pasarni ghat connecting Wai and hill station of Panchgani.yarana old movies parasuit 
 "Swades: We, the People"  - 2004 Hindi movie starring Shahrukh Khan was shot here among other villages.
 Also Ajay Devgan starrer Gangajal and Omkara was shot here.

Notable personalities
 Padma Shri Late B G Shirke, the noted industrialist and head of the Shirke Group of Industries was born in this village in 1918.
 Padma Shri Shahir Krishnarao Ganpatrao Sable popularly known as "Shahir Sable", who is a famous Marathi language folk artiste was born in this village in 1923.

References 

Villages in Satara district